Seth David Bauer (born September 25, 1959 in Bridgeport, Connecticut) is an American rowing cox. He is Jewish. In 1988, he won a bronze medal at the Olympic Games, and he won a bronze at the 1981 World Championships and a gold at the 1987 World Championships.

References

External links
 
 
 

1959 births
Living people
American male rowers
Sportspeople from Bridgeport, Connecticut
Rowers at the 1988 Summer Olympics
Olympic bronze medalists for the United States in rowing
Coxswains (rowing)
Jewish American sportspeople
World Rowing Championships medalists for the United States
Medalists at the 1988 Summer Olympics
21st-century American Jews